Mannava  is a 1997 Indian Tamil-language action comedy film directed by L. M. Balaji and produced by Shanthi. The film stars Prashanth and Sanghavi, while Deva composed the film's music.

Plot
Eshwar is the son of R. Sundarrajan and Vadivukkarasi. He has a naturally helpful personality and will come to the rescue of anyone who is in difficulties. Eshwar's friend faces a problem marrying his fiancée. Eshwar helps his friend, which leads to a skirmish brawl, and Eshwar also falls in love with his friend's sister Kavitha. When Eshwar's love was accepted by both parents, they approach an astrologer, who predicts Eshwar to be isolated for some time to avoid disaster in his life. Eshwar arrives with his friend Mani (Goundamani) to their estate in Coonoor - Ooty, where numerous incidents take place. At one point of time, Sinthamani, a mentally retarded, forcibly takes asylum in Eshwar's estate. A local thug Kabali (Ponnambalam) tries to molest Sinthamani, and Eshwar chases Kabali away. Later, Kabali was found dead. Suriya, a police inspector, is deputed for investigating this case. Suriya is a relative of Kavitha, and they were supposed to marry. The investigation reveals evidence, and Eshwar is blamed for Kabali's murder. What happens next is to be watched.

Cast

Prashanth as Eashwar
Sanghavi as Kavitha
Goundamani as Raghupathy
Urvashi as Sinthamani
J. V. Somayajulu as Astrologist
Devan as Suriya
R. Sundarrajan as Eashwar's father
Vadivukkarasi as Eashwar's mother
Ponnambalam as Kabali
Rajesh as Kavitha's father
Ennatha Kannaiya 
Madhan Bob
Pandu

Soundtrack

The film score and the soundtrack were composed by Deva. The soundtrack, released in 1997, features 5 tracks. All the songs were Super hits.

Reception
New Straits Times called the film "above average, the kind you won't be tired of (except maybe during some of the songs)".

References

External links
 

Indian action comedy films
1997 films
1990s Tamil-language films
Films scored by Deva (composer)
1990s masala films
1997 action comedy films